The women's tournament in basketball at the 2019 Summer Universiade in Naples, Italy was held from 3 to 11 July 2019.

Teams

Preliminary round

Pool A 

|}

Pool B 

|}

Pool C 

|}

Pool D 

|}

9th to 16th place classification

Bracket

9–16th place quarterfinals

13–16th place semifinals

9–12th place semifinals

15th place game

13th place game

11th place game

9th place game

1st to 8th place classification

Bracket

Quarterfinals

5–8th place semifinals

Semifinals

7th place game

5th place game

Bronze medal game

Gold medal game

Final standings

References 

Women
2019
International women's basketball competitions hosted by Italy
2019 in women's basketball
2019 in Italian women's sport